The Leshy (also Leshi; ; literally, "[he] from the forest") is a tutelary deity of the forests in pagan Slavic mythology. As the spirit rules over the forest and hunting, he may be related to the Slavic god Porewit. 

There is also a deity, named Svyatibor (Svyatobor, Svyatibog), who is mentioned in the beliefs of the Eastern and Western Slavs as the god of forests and the lord of the leshies. His functions were identical to those of the god Veles.

The Leshy is masculine and humanoid in shape, is able to assume any likeness and can change in size and height.<ref>Maksimov, S. V. (1912) Нечистая сила. Неведомая сила // Собрание сочинений [The Unclean Force, The Unknown Force, Collected Works]. pp. 79-80.</ref> In some accounts, Leshy is described as having a wife (Leshachikha, Leszachka, Lesovikha and also, sometimes, the Kikimora of the swamp) and children (leshonki, leszonky). He is known by some to have a propensity to lead travelers astray and abduct children (which he shares with Chort, the "Black One"), which would lead some to believe he is an evil entity. He is, however, also known to have a more neutral disposition towards humans, dependent on the attitudes and behaviours of an individual person, or local population, towards the forest. Leshy could take children who were cursed by their relatives (in particular, parents) away to the forest people. Some would therefore describe him as more of a temperamental being, like a fairy. 

 Names and etymology 

The Leshy is known by a variety of names and spellings including the following:Afanasyev, Alexander Nikolayevich. (1983) Древо жизни и лесные духи [The Tree of Life and Forest Spirits]. Sovremennik. Moscow.Krinichnaya, Neonila Artyomovna. (2004) Русская мифология: Мир образов фольклора [Russian Mythology: The World of Folklore Images]. Akademicheskii Proyekt. Moscow. ch. 3, "Leshy: Totemic origins and the polysemy of images".  

Main name variations:
 Borovoi "[he] of the pine barrens"
 Gayevoi "[he] of the grove"
 Leshak
 Leshy (Russian: Леший) [he] of the deciduous forests
 Lesnik
 Lesovik
 Lesovoi
 Lesun
 Mežainis, (Latvian: "forester") 
 Miškinis  (Lithuanian: "forest-man")
 Miško velnias (Lithuanian: "Forest devil")
 Vir'ava "forest mother"
 Lauma (Latvian: Lauma) or (Lithuanian: Laumė), or (Yotvingian: Łauma), a fairy-like woodland spirit, and guardian spirit of orphans in Eastern Baltic mythology, or Yotvingian mitology

Euphemistic titles:
 He also used for the devil, based on superstition prohibiting invocation of evil 
 He himself like "he"   
 Les chestnoi "honorable one of the forest"
 Les pravedniy "righteous one of the forest"
 Lesnoi dedushka/ded or Dedushka-lesovoi "forest grandfather"
 Lesnoi dukh "forest spirit"
 Lesnoi dyadya "forest uncle"
 Lesnoi khozyain "forest master"
 Lesnoi zhitel' "forest dweller" or "woodsman"
 Lesny muzhik , "forest man"

In popular culture
 Leshy is used as a prototype for the main character of Vladimir Vysotsky's song "Lukomorye", where Leshy is depicted as an alcoholic who spends all his money on drinking and is abusive to his wife.
 Leshy was the inspiration for an antagonist of the video game Inscryption'', who is also named Leshy.
 In Karol Kalinowwski's comic book Łauma the main protagonist is guarded by Yotvingians' version of Leshy, Lauma. He/she also appears on the cover.

See also 

 Äbädä (Tatarstan)
 Basajaun (Basque Country)
 Berstuk (Wend people of Germany)
 Boruta (Slavic region)
 Grand Bois (loa) (Haiti)
 Hidebehind (Americas)
 Jinn (Arabian, Islamic)
 Vörsa (Komi Republic)
 List of nature deities (Slavic mythology)
 Ochopintre (Republic of Georgia)
 Shatans (Belarus, Russian Federation)
 Shishiga (Russia)
 Silvanus (Ancient Rome and Gaul)
 Woodwose (medieval Europe)
 Yum Caax (Mayan)

References

External links 
 
 

Russian folklore characters
Mythological tricksters
Shapeshifting
Slavic gods
Slavic tutelary deities
Forest spirits
Slavic folklore characters